Lautaro Iván Carrachino (born 16 April 1997) is an Argentine former professional footballer who played as a forward.

Career
Carrachino started his career in the youth of San Lorenzo. In August 2018, Carrachino completed a loan move to Primera B Nacional's Almagro. He made his professional debut on 28 October, appearing for the final six minutes of a goalless draw with Nueva Chicago at the Estadio Nueva Chicago. Further appearances followed against Atlético de Rafaela, Gimnasia y Esgrima and Instituto, in a campaign that saw him be an unused substitute eleven times. Carrachino returned to San Lorenzo on 30 June 2019, but was soon released by the club.

Personal life
In May 2014, Carrachino had a warrant out for his arrest for an alleged involvement in a robbery which led to a homicide. He was later declared unimpeachable and agreed to testify. On 12 September 2020, Carrachino was named as a potential suspect by prosecutor Juan Pablo Tahtagian following the murder of a 20-year-old woman and a 30-year-old man in Ciudad Evita on 10 September. A few weeks later, he was officially declared wanted by two different investigations; one investigating a singular homicide from January 2020, while the other announced he and accomplice Cristian Cruz (alias: Chucky) were the leaders of drug gang La banda del 15; who were wanted for multiple charges, including robbery and coercion.

Career statistics

References

External links

1997 births
Living people
People from Morón Partido
Argentine footballers
Association football forwards
Primera Nacional players
San Lorenzo de Almagro footballers
Club Almagro players
Sportspeople from Buenos Aires Province